The Mislei is a left tributary of the river Telega in Romania. It discharges into the Telega in the village Mislea.

References

Rivers of Romania
Rivers of Prahova County